Bristol University, previously Bristol College, was a proprietary higher education institution in Bristol, Tennessee, that closed in 1994.

The school specialized in business education. As of 1989, it operated in both Bristol and Knoxville, Tennessee and enrolled a total of approximately 350 students in the two locations. It also operated in Indianapolis, Indiana, from 1991 to 1994.
There was also a satellite campus located in Johnson City, Tennessee.

History
The institution was started in 1895.

Jack O. Anderson became president of Bristol College in 1969 and remained on its board until 1988. Ron Cosby later became its president. In 1989, Cosby sold the school to Craven Sumerell of South Carolina. Sumerell had previously founded and operated American Management College in Spartanburg, South Carolina, which closed in February 1989, and before that had directed Limestone College's off-campus management program. American Management College's records were transferred to Bristol University. Bristol University closed in 1994 and Sumerell and his wife filed for bankruptcy in 1995.

Legacy
Students who attended the Bristol University location in Indianapolis, Indiana, can obtain transcripts and degree information from the Indiana Commission on Proprietary Education.

Sports
Bristol University Men's Baseball team won the 1989 and 1990 National Small College Athletic Association (NSCAA) Championships in McPherson, Kansas with Gerald Opp as head coach and went on to win the 1993 and 1994 NSCAA National Championships in Tyler, Texas  with Gil Payne as head coach. 
At times during its history, Bristol College fielded a men's basketball team. In the 1985-86 season the team compiled a record of 30 wins and 13 losses and was the National Little College National Association National Champion, the team was coached by Brien "Briefcase" Crowder

Notable alumni
Notable people who attended Bristol College or University include
Steve Godsey.

References

1994 disestablishments in Tennessee
Bristol, Tennessee
Defunct private universities and colleges in Tennessee
Defunct private universities and colleges in Indiana